Susan Jane Tolchin (January 14, 1941 – May 18, 2016) was an American political scientist.

Life 
Susan Jane Goldsmith was born in Manhattan to Jacob Goldsmith, a lawyer, and his wife Dorothy (née Markowitz), a teacher. 
She graduated from Bryn Mawr College, the University of Chicago and New York University. 
She taught at Mount Vernon College, at The George Washington University during the early 1990s, and George Mason University.

She married journalist Martin Tolchin, a founder of Politico, in 1965, coauthored many books on American politics and remained married until her death. They had two children; Charles (d. 2003) and Karen. She died of ovarian cancer at her home in Washington on May 18, 2016, at the age of 75.

Works

References 

1941 births
2016 deaths
20th-century American non-fiction writers
20th-century American women writers
21st-century American non-fiction writers
21st-century American women writers
American political scientists
American women political scientists
Bryn Mawr College alumni
Deaths from cancer in Washington, D.C.
Deaths from ovarian cancer
George Mason University faculty
George Washington University faculty
New York University alumni
University of Chicago alumni
Writers from Manhattan